The Denver Pop Festival was a three-day music festival promoted by Barry Fey (Feyline) on June 27–29, 1969 which was largely overshadowed by Woodstock two months later.  The peak attendance was estimated at 50,000.

History
Unlike the free-form happening in upstate New York, the Denver festival had the full support and local resources of a major city, taking place in Denver Mile High Stadium.  There were high expectations for the Festival; it was commonly called the "First Annual" Denver Pop Festival. The peak attendance was estimated at 50,000, though on Sunday when it was declared a free festival, that number may have been higher.  Ticket prices were $6 per day, or $15 for all three days (Fri, Sat, Sun).

Frank Zappa is credited by some with inventing the audience wave during his set.  He assigned sections of the stadium (audience) to each make different odd sounds and gestures, including standing with arms raised.  He then "played" a "tune" on his "crowd instrument".

The festival featured the final performance of The Jimi Hendrix Experience, then the highest paid act in rock. (Noel Redding left the Experience on June 29th, 1969.)

Performers

June 27
 Big Mama Thornton
 The Flock 
 Clown
 Store Bought, Store Thought
 Three Dog Night
 Liar 
 Celebrate 
 One 
 Drum Solo   -   Floyd Sneed performed his  amazing solo featuring his "Lafrican" method of playing the drums for an aspiring 10+ minutes including over 3 minutes of Congo style hand playing.
 Frank Zappa and The Mothers of Invention
 Hungry Freaks Daddy 
 Downtown Talent Scout (long version, called "The Heat's Out Every Night")
 The String Quartet
 Some Ballet Music
 A Pound for a Brown on the Bus
 Zappa conducts the audience ("Teenage Stereo")
 Iron Butterfly

June 28
 Aorta
 Zephyr (with Tommy Bolin)
 Poco
 Johnny Winter
 Rollin' & Tumblin'
 Help Me
 Leland Mississippi
 Going Down Slow
 Mean Town Blues
 I'm Not Sure
 It's My Own Fault
 Tim Buckley
 Dolphins
 Gypsy Woman
 Buzzin' Fly
 The Train 
 Creedence Clearwater Revival
 Bad Moon Rising   -   note: the moon rising large and bright behind the stage at dusk prompting an immediate encore performance.

June 29
 Aum
 Zephyr (with Tommy Bolin)  <<  Their Sunday show was not scheduled, they were filling in for an act that dropped out.
 Rev. Cleophus Robinson
 Joe Cocker
 Three Dog Night
 The Jimi Hendrix Experience (final performance together)
 Tax Free
 Hear My Train A Comin'
 Fire
 Spanish Castle Magic
 Red House
 Foxy Lady
 Star Spangled Banner
 Purple Haze
 Voodoo Chile - Slight Return

See also

 Monterey Pop Festival
 Woodstock Festival
List of music festivals in the United States
List of pop music festivals
List of historic rock festivals

Further reading
Colorado Rocks!: A Half Century of Music in Colorado by George Brown (WestWinds Press, 2004).
Backstage Past by Barry Fey (Lone Wolf Press, 2011), pp. 38-45.

References

External links

Folk festivals in the United States
1969 in American music
Rock festivals in the United States
Music festivals established in 1969
Pop music festivals in the United States
1969 music festivals